

Panipahan is a small town near Bagansiapiapi, Riau Province, Indonesia, 35 Miles northwest from Bagansiapiapi. Panipahan can be reached from Bagansiapiapi (1.5 hours by boat) and from Tanjung Balai Asahan (2.5 hours by boat)
Almost half of its area is on the sea.  There is a big festival on 24th of 10th month in the Chinese Lunar calendar. Motorcycles are the main transportation in Panipahan, cars are rare. There are small hotels.

External links
 Community website

Populated places in Riau
Regencies of Riau